Roma Elizabeth Dunn (born 1943) is an Australian international lawn bowler.

Bowls career
Dunn made her Australian debut in 1995 and won double bronze in the triples and fours at the 2000 World Outdoor Bowls Championship in Moama.

She won the silver medal in the triples at the 2004 World Outdoor Bowls Championship.

She won seven medals at the Asia Pacific Bowls Championships including three gold medals.

References

External links
 
 
 

Living people
1943 births
Australian female bowls players
Commonwealth Games medallists in lawn bowls
Commonwealth Games silver medallists for Australia
Bowls players at the 2006 Commonwealth Games
20th-century Australian women
21st-century Australian women
Medallists at the 2006 Commonwealth Games